Geoffrey Michael Eames  (born 26 November 1945) is an Australian jurist, who was a judge of the Supreme Court of Victoria. He served in the trial division of the Court from 1992 to 2002, and was then a member of the Court of Appeal until 2007. He subsequently served as an Acting Judge of the Supreme Court of the Northern Territory, and as Chief Justice of Nauru.

Early life
Eames was born in Melbourne in 1945. He was educated at St. Bernard's College in Essendon, then studied law at the University of Melbourne, graduating with a Bachelor of Laws.

Career
Eames did articles at the firm of Slater and Gordon, and was admitted to the Victorian Bar in 1969.
In the 1970s he joined the Central Australian Legal Service as its principle Solicitor, and was then seconded to the Central Land Council in Alice Springs where he pioneered all early land claims made under the Aboriginal Land Rights Act, Northern Territory, 1976 and the passage of the legislation itself, before heading to the bar in Darwin.

In 1980, he was admitted to the bar in South Australia, joining the independent bar in 1984. Eames was a member of Hanson Chambers from 1987 to 1991, and took silk as a Queen's Counsel in South Australia in 1989 and in Victoria in 1990. During this time he worked as a barrister in two Royal Commissions: the McClelland Royal Commission (1985) into British nuclear testing in Australia, and the Royal Commission into Aboriginal Deaths in Custody (1987–1991).

Supreme Court of Victoria
On 26 May 1992, Eames was appointed as a judge of the Supreme Court of Victoria. On 15 March 2002 he was appointed a judge of the Court of Appeal and served until 2007.

Supreme Court of the Northern Territory
Eames was appointed as an Acting Judge of the Supreme Court of the Northern Territory between 2007 and 2009.

Supreme Court of Nauru
In December 2010, Eames was appointed Chief Justice of the two-member Supreme Court of Nauru. In January 2014, the Chief Magistrate of Nauru, Peter Law, issued an injunction to prevent the deportation of three foreign nationals. Law was fired by Nauru President Baron Waqa and himself deported. Eames, in Australia at the time, issued an injunction to prevent the deportation of Law, however Law was deported. The Nauru government cancelled Eames' visa which prevented his return to Nauru, and he resigned two months later. The incidents involving Law and Eames were  criticised by Mathew Batsiua a member of Nauru's Opposition and precipitated a government crackdown on opposition.

Publications

References

 

1945 births
Living people
Judges of the Supreme Court of Victoria
Judges of the Supreme Court of the Northern Territory
Chief justices of Nauru
Australian judges on the courts of Nauru
20th-century Australian judges
21st-century Australian judges
Australian King's Counsel
Australian barristers
Members of the Order of Australia